Hiranandani Parks, formerly known as Hirco Palace Gardens, is a 369-acre residential township consisting of several skyscraper condominiums in Chennai, India. It is located in the southern suburb of Oragadam.

History
In 2006, the Mumbai-based real estate company Hiranandani Group bought close to 480 acres of land in Palur village.

Location
The township is located at Oragadam in South Chennai.

The towers
Built on a 369-acre plot, the complex consists of 27 high-rise towers ranging from 16 floors to 28 floors.

A township has a 250-meter, 12-bay golf driving range, and a nine-hole, resort-style golf course has been planned on 50 acres.

The towers within the complex are listed in the table below:

See also

 List of tallest buildings in Chennai

References

External links
 Official website of the apartment complex

Skyscrapers in Chennai
Skyscraper residential buildings in Chennai